Wayne "Homeboy" Turner, alternatively spelt Waine, (born 21 April 1967) is a Birmingham based Kickboxer from Handsworth. He is a former I.S.K.A. World Cruiserweight Kickboxing Champion who has fought for a number of promotions including K-1 over a lengthy career.

Biography/Career
Turner was born in Aldershot into a military family. Ryan Mensch taught him every fighting skill that took him to success.  He was a sickly child growing up, suffering from a multitude of symptoms including asthma.  At age three he had an accident and was told he would never have a normal life as a child but with great persistence proved all the naysayers wrong as he started keeping fit and got into kickboxing.

Turner would have some success as an amateur and pro kickboxer fighting in locations across England, winning three British national titles (two with the W.K.A. and one with W.A.K.O.  In 1999 he made his debut with the world's top kickboxing promotion K-1 losing via stoppage against PRIDE fighter Satoshi Honma in Sapporo, Japan.  As one of the country's top amateur kickboxers, Turner was invited to join the British national team to take part in the 2001 W.A.K.O. world championships where he took a bronze medal.

Turner had semi-retired in 2004 aged 37, but he was tempted back into the ring in 2007 after being offered a World title shot – an opportunity that had eluded him until that point. Fighting at the site of his very first amateur bout, Dudley Concert Hall, "Homeboy" defeated Paul Hill on points after twelve rounds – having knocked him down in the ninth – on 15 April 2007. Turner had originally been scheduled to fight Alessandro Venditti; the Italian had to pull out for personal reasons.  After holding the title for a little over a year, Turner lost his world title to Daniel "Pinta" Quigley on 17 May 2008 in Letterkenny County Donegal.

Titles

Professional
2007–08 I.S.K.A. cruiserweight world champion (0 title defences)
W.A.K.O. Pro Super Cruiserweight European champion (undisputed)
x2 British champion
 W.K.A British Heavyweight Champion
 W.A.K.O. Pro Super Cruiserweight British Champion (Undisputed)

Amateur
2001 W.A.K.O. World Championships in Belgrade, Serbia & Montenegro  −91 kg (Full-Contact)
W.A.K.O. Light Continuous British champion
x3 time British national light continuous champion
x4 time British national semi-contact team champion

Kickboxing Record 

|-
|-  bgcolor="#CCFFCC"
| 1997-05-11 || Win ||align=left| Simon Dore || W.A.K.O Pro Super Cruiserweight British Title|| Dudley, England ||Points || 7th Round ||
|-
! style=background:white colspan=9 |
|-
|-  bgcolor="#CCFFCC"
|-  bgcolor="#CCFFCC"
| 1997-11-30 || Win ||align=left| Chris Watts || Eliminator for W.A.K.O Pro Super Cruiserweight European Title|| West Bromwich, England ||KO || 3rd Round ||1:00
|-  bgcolor="#CCFFCC"
| 1998-06-28 || Win ||align=left| Micheal Dochety || Super Cruiserweight Bout|| Northampton, England || KO || 1st Round ||1:20
|-  bgcolor="#CCFFCC"
| 1998-09-06 || Win ||align=left| Chris Ballard || W.K.A British Heavyweight Title|| Worcester, England || Points|| 7th Round ||
|-
! style=background:white colspan=9 |
|-
|-  bgcolor="#FFBBBB"
| 1998-10-28 || Loss ||align=left| Augusto Sparano || W.A.K.O Pro Super Cruiserweight European Title|| Trieste, Italy || Decision (Split) || 10th||
|-  bgcolor="#FFBBBB"
| 1999-06-06 || Loss ||align=left| Satoshi Honma || K-1 Survival '99 || Sapporo, Japan || TKO (Ref Stop/3 Knockdowns: Leg Kicks) || 3 || 1:34
|-
|-  bgcolor="#CCFFCC"
| 1999-12-05 || Win ||align=left| Ceri Walker || Thai Boxing Heavyweight|| Birmingham, England || Points|| 5th ||
|-  bgcolor="#FFBBBB"
| 2000-04-16 || Loss ||align=left| Ricky Nickolson || K-1 UK Battle of Britain 2000, Quarter Final || Birmingham, England, UK || KO || 2 || 2:45
|-
|-  bgcolor="#CCFFCC"
| 2000-10-01 || Win ||align=left| Kevin Smiles || W.A.K.O. Pro European Super Cruiserweight|| Birmingham, England || Points || 10th ||
|-  bgcolor="#FFBBBB"
|-
! style=background:white colspan=9 |
|-
|-  bgcolor="#FFBBBB"
| 2006-10-15 || Loss ||align=left| Simon Aston || K-1 "First Step Road to Tokyo" '06, Super Fight || Wolverhampton, England, UK || Decision (Split) || 5 || 3:00
|-
|-  bgcolor="#CCFFCC"
| 2007-04-15 || Win ||align=left| Paul Hill || I.S.K.A. World Championship Kickboxing || Birmingham, England, UK || Decision || 12 || 2:00
|-
! style=background:white colspan=9 |
|-
|-  bgcolor="#FFBBBB"
| 2008-03-09 || Loss ||align=left| Marlon Hunt || Showdown 3 || Sheffield, England, UK || Decision || 12 || 2:00 
|-
! style=background:white colspan=9 |
|-
|-  bgcolor="#FFBBBB"
| 2008-05-17 || Loss ||align=left| Daniel Quigley || I.S.K.A. World Championship Kickboxing || Letterkenny, Ireland || TKO (Ref Stop) || 5 || 
|-
! style=background:white colspan=9 |
|-
|-
| colspan=9 | Legend:

See also 
List of K-1 events
List of male kickboxers

References

External links
Waine Turner Official website

English male kickboxers
Cruiserweight kickboxers
1967 births
Living people
Sportspeople from Aldershot
Sportspeople from Handsworth, West Midlands